The 1941 Iraqi coup d'état (Thawrah Rašīd ʿAlī al-Kaylānī), also called the Rashid Ali Al-Gaylani coup or the Golden Square coup, was a nationalist coup d'état in Iraq on 1 April 1941 that overthrew the pro-British regime of Regent 'Abd al-Ilah and his Prime Minister Nuri al-Said and installed Rashid Ali al-Gaylani as Prime Minister.

The coup was led by four Iraqi nationalist army generals, known as "the Golden Square", who intended to use the war to press for full Iraqi independence following the limited independence granted in 1932. To that end, they worked with German intelligence and accepted military assistance from Nazi Germany and Fascist Italy. The change in government led to the British invasion of Iraq and subsequent occupation until 1947.

The coup
From 1939 to 1941 a pro-British government headed by the Regent 'Abd al-Ilah and Prime Minister Nuri as-Said ruled Iraq. Iraq severed relations with Germany on 5 September 1939, following the outbreak of World War II in Europe. However, Nuri had to tread carefully between his close relationship with Britain and dependence on pro-German Army officers and cabinet members. By that time, Iraq became a refuge to Arab leaders who fled Mandatory Palestine as a result of the failed Palestinian Arab revolt against the British. Among the key figures to arrive was the Grand Mufti of Jerusalem, Haj Amin al-Husseini, the Palestinian Arab nationalist leader of the failed revolt.

The Golden Square coup was launched on 1 April 1941, overthrowing the Regent and installing Rashid Ali al-Gaylani as Prime Minister.

British response

Empire forces sent to quell the revolt

On 18 April, Britain reacted by landing the Indian 20th Infantry Brigade at Basra, the first used Native Assyrian Levies esp in Habbaniyah. elements of Iraqforce. Britain claimed it was entitled to do this under its defence treaty with Iraq.

Siege of Habbaniya
Upon arrival, the Iraqis demanded that the British not move any troops nor aircraft in or out of the base. The British responded by first demanding that the Iraqis leave the area and then, following the expiry of an ultimatum given in the early hours of 2 May, launched an attack. The base had a force of 96 lightly-armed aircraft, most of which were either purpose-built trainers or obsolete combat aircraft converted to training use. They also had an understrength battalion from the King's Own Royal Regiment (Lancaster), six companies of Assyrian Levies (troops raised by the British), 18 armored cars and a company of RAF personnel, giving a total strength of 2,200 troops to defend the base. The Royal Iraqi Air Force, despite having aircraft that included numerous modern British-, Italian- and US-built machines, failed to defeat the RAF. By the second day of fighting (3 May), four Blenheim fighter bombers arrived.

With British forces having air superiority, the Iraqi army was forced back to Fallujah and the RAF attacked the Iraqi Air Force bases at Mosul and Rashid. Habbaniya had essentially lifted the siege with its own resources.

Reinforcements, officially called "Iraqforce", came from two directions. British and Arab Legion forces arrived in two columns (Habforce and Kingcol) across the desert from Palestine and Transjordan. Additional Indian forces continued to arrive in Basra.

The Iraqi army was driven out of Fallujah and pursued to Baghdad, which fell within a week. This cleared the way for the nominal restoration of the Regent and the pro-British government. British military occupation of Iraq continued until late 1947.

German and Italian support for the nationalists

In the course of the Iraq war, minor reinforcements for the nationalists were received from first Germany and then Italy. Arriving aircraft were crudely painted with Iraqi colours. Small numbers of Luftwaffe (German air force) bombers and heavy fighters, followed a few days later by obsolescent Regia Aeronautica (Italian air force) biplane fighters, flew sorties from Mosul against both RAF Habbaniya and the relieving Empire forces moving across from Transjordan. This was done to little effect.

The Vichy French authorities in the Syria and Lebanon had helped both the pro-Axis Iraqi nationalists and the German and Italian air forces, providing airfields for staging and refuelling. Even before the end of the Iraq campaign, this had led to RAF attacks on airbases in Syria. Within weeks these events led to British and Empire forces invading of Vichy-administered Syria and Lebanon in the Syria–Lebanon Campaign.

See also
 14 July Revolution
 Airspeed Oxford
 Fairey Gordon
 Farhud
 Fawzi al-Qawuqji
 Führer Directive No. 30
 Gloster Gladiator
 Hawker Audax
 King's Own Royal Regiment (Lancaster)
 Vickers Type 264 Valentia
 Vickers Wellington

References

Sources

 — an RAF pupil pilot's diary of the Habbaniya campaign

External links

Iraq
Iraqi Coup D'etat, 1941
20th century in Iraq
Arab nationalism in Iraq
Arab nationalist rebellions
Arab rebellions in Iraq
Iraqi coup d'etat
Iraq in World War II
Iraq–United Kingdom relations
Iraqi nationalism
Kingdom of Iraq
Middle East theatre of World War II
Military coups in Iraq
Rebellions in Iraq
April 1941 events